Compass Maps was a U.S. publisher of road maps.  It was based in Modesto, California.

It was founded in 1963 by Dick and Shirley Elke. They produced high
quality maps of Northern and Southern California. They also did some
maps of places in Nevada (Reno, Las Vegas), as well as Salt Lake City,
Utah. In 2007, they had nearly 100 area maps that they produced. However, the company shut down in March 2008 for reorganization, then reopened in May of that same year, to only shut down, this time for good, in June 2008. They were located on 1172 Kansas Avenue in Modesto, just west of Highway 99.

References

Mass media companies of the United States
Map companies of the United States
Map publishing companies
Companies based in Stanislaus County, California
Publishing companies established in 1963